Fliura Abbate-Bulatova is a former Soviet and then Italian table tennis player. Born in 1963 in Uzbekistan, then part of USSR, her main achievement has been the gold medal in the single competition at the Table Tennis European Championships in 1988. She won several other medals in international competitions. 
She is also a multiple USSR National champion - twice in singles, three times in doubles and once in mixed doubles.

See also
 List of table tennis players

References

Uzbekistani female table tennis players
Soviet table tennis players
Italian female table tennis players
Living people
Table tennis players at the 1988 Summer Olympics
Table tennis players at the 1996 Summer Olympics
Olympic table tennis players of the Soviet Union
Olympic table tennis players of Italy
Uzbekistani emigrants to Italy
People from Samarqand Region
1963 births